The Central District of Bahar County is a district (bakhsh) in Bahar County, Hamadan Province, Iran. At the 2006 census, its population was 49,138, in 12,227 families.  The District has one city: Bahar. The District has two rural districts (dehestan): Abrumand Rural District and Simineh Rud Rural District.

References 

Bahar County
Districts of Hamadan Province